Myrtle Township may refer to:

 Myrtle Township, Knox County, Missouri
 Myrtle Township, Oregon County, Missouri
 Myrtle Township, Custer County, Nebraska